Kronsgaard is a municipality in the district of Schleswig-Flensburg, in Schleswig-Holstein, Germany. Konsgaard is directly located at the coast of the Baltic Sea.

References

Municipalities in Schleswig-Holstein
Schleswig-Flensburg